Griffithsia is a genus of red algae in the family Wrangeliaceae.

Carl Adolph Agardh named Griffithsia in the honour of phycologist Amelia Griffiths (1768–1858).

Griffithsin is a protein isolated from species of Griffithsia.

Species 
Griffithsia aestivana - Griffithsia antarctica - Griffithsia balara - Griffithsia capitata - Griffithsia caribaea - Griffithsia caudata - Griffithsia chilensis - Griffithsia coacta - Griffithsia confervoides - Griffithsia corallinoides - Griffithsia crassiuscula - Griffithsia devoniensis - Griffithsia elegans - Griffithsia genovefae - Griffithsia globulifera - Griffithsia grandis - Griffithsia gunniana - Griffithsia heteroclada - Griffithsia heteromorpha - Griffithsia intertexta - Griffithsia intricata - Griffithsia japonica - Griffithsia metcalfii - Griffithsia monilis - Griffithsia myriophyllum - Griffithsia okiensis - Griffithsia opuntioides - Griffithsia ovalis - Griffithsia pacifica - Griffithsia phyllamphora - Griffithsia pilalyea - Griffithsia pulvinata - Griffithsia radicans - Griffithsia redicata - Griffithsia rhizophora - Griffithsia schousboei - Griffithsia secundiramea - Griffithsia subcylindrica - Griffithsia teges - Griffithsia tingitana - Griffithsia tomo-yamadae - Griffithsia torulosa - Griffithsia traversii - Griffithsia venusta - Griffithsia weber-van-bosseae

References

External links 
 
 
 Griffithsia at AlgaeBase

Red algae genera
Ceramiales